MV Cape Ducato (T-AKR-5051) was delivered in September 1972, as MV Barranduna at Eriksbergs Mekaniska Verkstads AB, Sweden.  She was acquired by the US Maritime Administration (MARAD) on 18 November 1985 and renamed MV Cape Ducato.  She was assigned to MARAD Ready Reserve Force, (RRF) and is one of the Military Sealift Command's (MSC) 31 Roll-on/Roll-off ships and one of the 63 ships of the Sealift Program Office. Cape Ducato is laid up as part of the National Defense Reserve Fleet in a layberth at Joint Base Charleston in North Charleston, South Carolina in ROS-5 status.

References 
 MV Cape Ducato (T-AKR-5051)

External links 
 National Defense Reserve Fleet Inventory
 Property Management and Archives Record System

 

Cape Ducato-class vehicle cargo ships
Ships built in Gothenburg
1972 ships